The Micești or Păuleasca is a right tributary of the Râul Doamnei in Romania. It flows into the Râul Doamnei in Colibași.

References

Rivers of Romania
Rivers of Argeș County